Rebekah Kennedy is an American actress. She is best known for her work on Law & Order: Special Victims Unit, Bastard and House Hunting.

Life and career

Rebekah was born in Arlington, Texas. She holds a B.A. in Musical Theatre from Palm Beach Atlantic University. In 2011, she had her first big screen role in the movie Season of the Witch, with Nicolas Cage and Ron Perlman. In 2012, she played the lead role in the film House Hunting, with Marc Singer and Art LaFleur.

Rebekah has also acted in numerous television series, including Law & Order: Special Victims Unit and Criminal Minds. She also known for her role as Penny in Netflix's To the Bone.

Filmography

Film

Television

References

External links
 

Living people
Actresses from Texas
People from Arlington, Texas
21st-century American actresses
American television actresses
Year of birth missing (living people)
American film actresses